The 1921 Trinity Blue Devils football team was an American football team that represented Trinity College (later renamed Duke University) as a member of the South Atlantic Intercollegiate Athletic Association (SAIAA) during the 1921 college football season. In its first and only season under head coach James A. Baldwin, the team compiled a 6–1–2 record (0-1 against SAIAA opponents). Richard Leach was the team captain.

Schedule

References

Trinity
Duke Blue Devils football seasons
Trinity Blue and White football